John Alexander Scott Coutts (9 December 1902 – 5 August 1962), better known by the pseudonym John Willie, was an artist, fetish photographer, editor and the publisher of the first 20 issues of the fetish magazine Bizarre, featuring his characters Sweet Gwendoline and Sir Dystic d'Arcy. Though distributed underground, Bizarre magazine had a far-reaching impact on later fetish-themed publications and experienced a resurgence in popularity, along with fetish model Bettie Page, beginning in the 1970s.

Early life 
John Coutts was born in 1902 to a British family in Singapore. They returned to the United Kingdom in 1903. He grew up in a middle-class family and attended the Royal Military College, Sandhurst. Commissioned as a Second Lieutenant into the Royal Scots, Coutts was forced to resign in 1925 when he married a night-club hostess, Eveline Fisher, without the permission of his commanding officer. He migrated with his wife to Australia, where their marriage ended in divorce in 1930.

Early career 
After moving to Brisbane, Australia, in 1926, Coutts joined a local High Heel Club, where he was probably introduced to the print media of a community of "shoe lovers" and other fetishists. He met his future second wife, Holly Anna Faram, c. 1936 and the couple married in 1942. She became his muse and often modelled for him. Because of his access to the High Heel Club's mailing list, Willie was able to begin producing and selling his own illustrations and photographs. He worked at a variety of jobs as well as pursuing his hobby and eventually established a company to produce exotic footwear called "Achilles". In 1945, Willie moved to North America, while Holly chose to remain in Australia, where she died in 1983 at the age of 70. Willie wished to settle in New York but was forced to remain in Montreal, Canada, for a year or so because of immigration issues.

Bizarre

Bizarre magazine began in late 1945, while Coutts was living in Canada. He published the magazine under the pseudonym of "John Willie", a name he kept for the duration of his career. Willie was introduced to the American fetish underground by Charles Guyette and later worked with Irving Klaw, the infamous BDSM merchandiser later charged with obscenity, but he is best known for his fetish cartoon character Sweet Gwendoline, which he drew in a style that influenced later artists such as Gene Bilbrew and Eric Stanton. Other characters include U69 (censored to U89 in some editions), the raven-haired dominatrix who ties up Gwendoline and Sir Dystic d'Arcy, the only prominent male character and probably a parody of Willie himself. Sweet Gwendoline was published as a serial in Robert Harrison's mainstream girlie magazine Wink from June 1947 to February 1950 and later in several other magazines over the years.

Bizarre was published, at irregular intervals, from 1946 to 1959. Despite the nature of the magazine, Coutts was able to circumvent censorship and orders to cease publication because he was careful to avoid "nudity, homosexuality, overt violence, or obvious depictions of things that might be read as perverse or immoral and that might rankle those parties who were capable of banning, censoring or blocking circulation." The magazine included many photographs, often of Willie's wife, and drawings of costume designs, some based on ideas from readers. There were also many letters from readers: he was accused of inventing these but insisted that they were genuine. These letters covered topics such as high heels, bondage, amputee fetishism, sadomasochism, transvestism, corsets and body modification. The magazine was suspended completely from 1947 to 1951. By 1956, Coutts was ready to give up the magazine and that year he sold it to someone described only as R.E.B., who published six more issues before Bizarre finally folded in 1959. There was no mention within the magazine that it had changed hands, but in issue no. 23 Mahlon Blaine was introduced by the editor as the artist who was to replace Willie as the primary illustrator.
After publishing the first 23 issues of Bizarre, Coutts moved to Hollywood, California, where in 1961 he developed a brain tumor and was forced to end his mail-order business. He destroyed his archives and returned home to England, where he died in his sleep in August 1962.

Legacy
Willie was portrayed by Jared Harris in the movie The Notorious Bettie Page (2006), which featured a fictional meeting between Willie and Page.

In 2009, Willie was inducted into the Leather Hall of Fame.

Quotations
"Unless a model is a good actress, and has 'that type' of face, it's difficult for her to look sad and miserable when working for me. My studio is a pretty cheerful place, and quite unlike the atmosphere that surrounds Gwendoline when the Countess gets hold of her."

"Bizarre. The magazine for pleasant optimists who frown on convention. The magazine of fashions and fantasies fantastic! Innumerable journals deal with ideas for the majority. Must all sheeplike follow in their wake? Bizarre is for those who have the courage of  the sown convictions. Conservative? — Old fashioned? — Not by any means! Where does a complete circle begin or end? Anderd doesn't fashion move in a circle? Futuristic? Not even that—there is nothing new in fashion, it is only for the application of new materials—new ornaments—a new process of making—coupled with the taste and ability to create the unusual and unorthodox to the trend of the moment."

"As for sex, ignorance is abysmal, because for centuries those who could not satisfy themselves, except by denying pleasure to others, have taught generation after generation that "sex is taboo." Thou shalt not think about it or discuss it. In fact, it's a dreadful thing, but it's all right as long as you don't enjoy it. If you have any other ideas on the subject, you are a pervert. The basis of a decent society is a happy home. Marriages break up almost invariably because of sex. What you do, or does not do, is your own business, all that matters is that the enjoyment be mutual, — and the time to discuss these things is before you get hitched up. There is a partner to suit everyone somewhere, but the search will be difficult until we can discuss our likes and dislikes, openly, in good taste, without threat from our own brand of standardized Police State."

See also 
 Charles Guyette
 Irving Klaw
 Eric Stanton
 Gene Bilbrew
 Bettie Page
 Fetish art
 Fetish artist

References

Further reading
Possibilities: The Photographs of John Willie, edited by J. B. Rund. New York: Bélier Press, 2016. 
The Adventures of Sweet Gwendoline, edited by J. B. Rund.(second edition, revised and enlarged) New York: Bélier Press, 1999.
 Eric Stanton & the History of the Bizarre Underground by Richard Pérez Seves. Atglen: Schiffer Publishing, 2018. 
 Charles Guyette: Godfather of American Fetish Art  [*Expanded Photo Edition*]  by Richard Pérez Seves. New York: FetHistory, 2018. 
A John Willie Portfolio, n. 1 (a cura di Carl McGuire), Van Nuys, CA., London Ent. Ltd., 1987
Bizarre: The Complete Reprint of John Willie's Bizarre Vols. 1–26;  Taschen. Edited by Eric Kroll.
, Paris, Futuropolis, 1985
The Art of John Willie – Sophisticated Bondage (Book One) 
An illustrated biography edited by Stefano Piselli & Riccardo Morrocchi (128 pages)
 The Art of John Willie – Sophisticated Bondage (Book Two)
An illustrated biography edited by Stefano Piselli & Riccardo Morrocchi (128 pages)
The Bound Beauties of Irving Klaw & John Willie, vol 2, Van Nuys, CA., Harmony Comm., 1977
The First John Willie Bondage Photo Book, Van Nuys, CA., London Ent. Ltd., 1978
The Second John Willie Bondage Photo Book, Van Nuys, CA., London Ent. Ltd., 1978
The Works of John Willie (a cura di Peter Stevenson), s.l., s.e., s.d.*

External links
 
 
 Lambiek.net
 "The Rembrandt of Pulp"
 American Fetish – Scholarly resources for the study of SM and Fetishism in American Culture
 

1902 births
1962 deaths
BDSM photographers
British comic strip cartoonists
Graduates of the Royal Military College, Sandhurst
Royal Scots officers
Fetish artists
Fetish photographers
British erotic photographers
British erotic artists
Bondage artists